Jishad Shamsudeen is an Indian fashion stylist / fashion designer from Thrissur, Kerala. He is specialised in designing customised Jean jacket. Currently, he is working as a personal designer stylist of Mohanlal. He is also associated with several stars in Bollywood and indian Film Industry. Currently, he is residing in Kochi.

Career 
Jishad had worked with some of the top designers in Bengaluru and then moved to Dubai in 2016. There he was working with Splash fashions as a denim artist and a denim designer. He got an offer to design a denim jacket for Salman Khan in the movie Race 3 and got several appreciations and its featured in the song "Heeriye". He is currently associated with several upcoming movies in Malayalam.

Recently in the view of COVID-19,  he designed a specialised wear for medical team and he is awaiting approvals for the same from the authority.

References

External links 
 

Living people
Indian male fashion designers
Artists from Kerala
21st-century Indian designers
Year of birth missing (living people)